Modjeska may refer to:

 Modjeska (name), a surname and given name
 Modjeska (confection), a caramel and marshmallow candy named for Helena Modjeska
 Modjeska Canyon, California, unincorporated community in eastern Orange County, California
 Modjeska Peak, northern mountain of Orange County's Saddleback formation

See also